East Cove National Wildlife Refuge is located south of Lake Charles, Louisiana along the southeast shore of Calcasieu Lake in Cameron Parish. It is accessible only by boat.

It is managed by the Cameron Prairie National Wildlife Refuge office as part of the Southwest Louisiana National Wildlife Refuge Complex.

Wildlife and habitat
The habitat is an estuarine marsh in the heart of the Cameron Creole Watershed.

Nineteen miles of lake shore levee and five water control structures are used to control water and salinity levels in this wetland.

Abundant fishery resources such as fish, shrimp, and crabs as well as migratory birds and alligators are found in the area.

See also
 List of National Wildlife Refuges: Louisiana

References

External links
 East Cove National Wildlife Refuge

Protected areas of Cameron Parish, Louisiana
National Wildlife Refuges in Louisiana
Protected areas established in 1937
Wetlands and bayous of Louisiana
Landforms of Cameron Parish, Louisiana